SAM-IV riboswitches are a kind of riboswitch that specifically binds S-adenosylmethionine (SAM), a cofactor used in many methylation reactions.  Originally identified by bioinformatics, SAM-IV riboswitches are largely confined to the Actinomycetales, an order of Bacteria.  Conserved features of SAM-IV riboswitch and experiments imply that they probably share a similar SAM-binding site to another class of SAM-binding riboswitches called SAM-I riboswitches.  However, the scaffolds of these two types of riboswitch appear to be quite distinct.  The structural relationship between these riboswitch types has been studied.

See also
 SAM-I riboswitch
 SAM-II riboswitch
 SAM-III riboswitch
 SAM-V riboswitch
 SAM-VI riboswitch

References

External links
 

Cis-regulatory RNA elements
Riboswitch